Preston Tower is a fourteenth-century pele tower in Preston, Northumberland, England built in 1392.

The tower is now a private museum.

References

External links 

Buildings and structures completed in 1392
Towers completed in the 14th century
Houses completed in the 14th century
Monuments and memorials in Northumberland
Museums in Northumberland
Peel towers in Northumberland
Military and war museums in England
Tower houses in the United Kingdom